Joleaudichthys is an extinct genus of prehistoric flatfish that lived from the early to middle Eocene of Egypt.

See also

 Prehistoric fish
 List of prehistoric bony fish

References

Eocene fish